Aldea del Pinar is a village in the southeastern province of Burgos, Castilla y León, Spain.

See also
List of municipalities in Burgos

Populated places in the Province of Burgos
Province of Burgos